Houghton is a commuter village to the north of Carlisle within the City of Carlisle district of Cumbria, England. It has a sub post office/grocers shop; Restaurant ; hairdressers; a village hall, a school for Key Stage 1 & 2 pupils and a St. John's church.  It is the largest settlement in the civil parish of Stanwix Rural. Hadrian's Wall runs past the village to the south along past Whiteclosegate. In 2018 it had an estimated population of 1168. In the Imperial Gazetteer of England and Wales of 1870-72 the township had a population of 369.

A large garden centre has opened in the grounds of Houghton Hall, a grade II listed structure.

See also

Listed buildings in Stanwix Rural

References

External links
  Cumbria County History Trust: Stanwix (nb: provisional research only - see Talk page)

Villages in Cumbria
City of Carlisle